Laos, officially the Lao People's Democratic Republic, has competed in seven Summer Olympic Games. They have not yet appeared at the Winter Olympic Games and also have not yet won an Olympic medal.

The National Olympic Committee of Laos was formed in 1975 and officially recognized by the International Olympic Committee in 1979.

Medal tables

Medals by Summer Games

See also
 List of flag bearers for Laos at the Olympics
 Laos at the Paralympics

External links
 
 
 

 
Sport in Laos